Skylab is an English/Japanese electronic group formed in 1993 by Howie B, Mat Ducasse, Masayuki Kudo, and Toshio Nakanishi.  They've released two full-length albums as well as several EPs and singles.  In 2015, Fact Magazine ranked their second album at #17 on its list of "The 50 Best Trip-Hop Albums of All Time".)

Kudo and Nakanishi (also known as Tosh & K.U.D.O.) had previously collaborated as members of Japanese groups such as Melon and Major Force, while Howie B had been engineering and mixing for Siouxsie and the Banshees, Soul II Soul, and Massive Attack.  Vocalist Debbie Sanders, formerly of Chapter & the Verse, first appeared on the band's debut album and was later made an official member of the group.

They have remixed and/or collaborated with acts such as Depeche Mode, Silver Apples, Shakespears Sister, David Holmes, Zap Mama, Barry Adamson, and Baxter.  Their work has also been featured on multiple compilations from the Red Hot AIDS Benefit Series of albums produced by the Red Hot Organization.

Discography

LPs
#1 (L'Attitude Records/Astralwerks, 1994)
#2 (Large as Life and Twice as Natural) (Eye Q Records 1999)

Singles & EPs
"River of Bass"/"Electric Blue" (L'Attitude, 1994)
"Seashell"/"Next" (L'Attitude, 1994)
"Exotika" (L'Attitude/Astralwerks, 1995)
Oh! Skylab (L'Attitude, 1995)
"These Are the Blues" (Astralwerks, 1996)
"The Trip" (Eye Q, 1996)
Bite This! (Eye Q, 1997)
? (Eye Q, 1997)
Judas! (Eye Q, 1997)
Magenta (Eye Q, 1998)
Promotion (Eye Q, 1998)
"The Viper" (Tummy Touch Records, 2003)
"Whuteverrpella" (digital-only release, 2021)

References

External links

Ambient music groups
 Trip hop groups
Astralwerks artists
British electronic music groups